Zbyněk Stanjura (born 15 February 1964) is a Czech politician who has been serving as Minister of Finance in Petr Fiala's Cabinet since 17 December 2021. He was previously appointed to Petr Nečas's Cabinet on 12 December 2012, serving as Minister of Transport until July 2013. He has been a member of the Chamber of Deputies since 2010. Stanjura previously served as Mayor of Opava from 2002 to 2010.

Political career 
Stanjura started his political career at municipal level, as mayor of Opava from 2002 to 2010 for the Civic Democratic Party (ODS). In 2010 he became a member of the Chamber of Deputies, and in December 2012 he was named Minister of Transport in Petr Nečas' Cabinet.

From 2013, Stanjura served as Chief Whip of the Civic Democratic Party under the leadership of Petr Fiala. He held his seat in the 2017 elections and was elected chief whip once again.

Stanjura took office as Minister of Finance after the 2021 elections. His stated aim as Finance Minister has been to implement spending cuts and to bring the fiscal deficit below 3 percent of gross domestic product.

Other activities 
 European Bank for Reconstruction and Development (EBRD), Ex-Officio Member of the Board of Governors (since 2021)
 European Investment Bank (EIB), Ex-Officio Member of the Board of Governors (since 2021)
 World Bank, Ex-Officio Member of the Board of Governors (since 2021)

References

1964 births
Living people
People from Opava
Civic Democratic Party (Czech Republic) MPs
Transport ministers of the Czech Republic
Civic Democratic Party (Czech Republic) Government ministers
Civic Democratic Party (Czech Republic) mayors
Mayors of places in the Czech Republic
Members of the Chamber of Deputies of the Czech Republic (2017–2021)
Members of the Chamber of Deputies of the Czech Republic (2013–2017)
Members of the Chamber of Deputies of the Czech Republic (2010–2013)
Members of the Chamber of Deputies of the Czech Republic (2021–2025)
Finance ministers of the Czech Republic
Brno University of Technology alumni